Nouveau Flamenco may refer to one of the following.

New flamenco, a music style fusing flamenco with other forms of music
Nouveau Flamenco (album), an album by Ottmar Liebert.

See also
 New Flamenco (ship)
 Flamenco (disambiguation)